Mehrobod (formerly Kamyshkurgan) is a jamoat in north-west Tajikistan. It is located in Asht District in Sughd Region. The jamoat has a total population of 13,123 (2015). It consists of 6 villages, including Khujiston (the seat, formerly Kamyshkurgan), Boshtol, Qaroqazon and Dulona.

References

Populated places in Sughd Region
Jamoats of Tajikistan